Edmund Glaise-Horstenau (also known as Edmund Glaise von Horstenau; 27 February 1882 – 20 July 1946) was an Austrian Nazi politician who became the last Vice-Chancellor of Austria, appointed by Chancellor Kurt Schuschnigg under pressure from Adolf Hitler, shortly before the 1938 Anschluss. 

During the Second World War Glaise-Horstenau became a general in the German Wehrmacht and served as Plenipotentiary General to the Independent State of Croatia. Dismayed by the atrocities committed by the Ustaše, he was involved in the Lorković-Vokić plot, with the purpose of overthrowing Ante Pavelić's regime and replacing it with a pro-Allied government.

Early life and career
Born in Braunau am Inn, the son of an officer, Glaise-Horstenau attended the Theresian Military Academy and served in World War I on the Austro-Hungarian General Staff of the Austro-Hungarian Army. From 1915, he headed the press department of the Supreme Command of the Armed Forces.

After the war, he studied history at the University of Vienna, together with his employment at the Austrian War Archives (as director from 1925 to 1938). He also achieved the rank of a colonel at the Austrian Heeresnachrichtenamt in 1934.

Originally a monarchist, Glaise-Horstenau became the second man in the hierarchy of the banned Austrian Nazi Party in the mid-to-late 1930s behind its leader Josef Leopold. To improve relations with Nazi Germany, he was appointed a member of the Staatsrat of the Federal State of Austria from 1934 in the rank of a Minister Without Portfolio, and from 1936 to 1938, he served as Federal Minister of the Interior in the cabinet of Chancellor Kurt Schuschnigg, after being appointed under pressure from Adolf Hitler following the Juliabkommen. At the meeting at the Berghof in Berchtesgaden on 12 February 1938 between Hitler and Schuschnigg, Germany demanded that Glaise-Horstenau be made Minister of War in a new pro-Nazi government and that he would establish close operational relations between the German and Austrian Armies, which would ultimately lead to the assimilation of the Austrian to the German system.

After Schuschnigg had to resign on 11 March, Glaise-Horstenau served as Vice-Chancellor of Austria under Arthur Seyß-Inquart for two days.

In Croatia

After the Anschluss, he entered the Wehrmacht and was appointed as Plenipotentiary General in the Independent State of Croatia on 14 April 1941. There, he was shocked by the atrocities of the Ustaše (Croatian fascist paramilitaries), which he repeatedly denounced and opposed. As early as 28 June 1941, he reported the following to the German High Command, the Oberkommando der Wehrmacht (OKW):

On 10 July, he added:

The lack of response from the OKW at Glaise-Horstenau's criticism of the Ustaše's methods increasingly frustrated him and caused deep tension with Ante Pavelić, the poglavnik, or head, of the Independent State of Croatia. By 1944, he had grown so dismayed at the atrocities that he had witnessed that he became deeply implicated in the Lorković-Vokić plot to overthrow Pavelić's regime and to replace it with a pro-Allied government.

The subsequent failure of that attempt turned Glaise-Horstenau into persona non grata for both the Croatians and the Nazis. In the first week of September, Pavelić and German ambassador Siegfried Kasche conspired together and effected his removal on 25 September. Glaise-Horstenau's withdrawal from the scene opened the door for the total politicalization of the Croatian armed forces, which occurred over the next several months.

Suicide
Glaise-Horstenau was then passed into Führer-Reserve and entrusted with the obscure task of Military Historian of the South East until his capture by the US Army on 5 May 1945. Fearing extradition to Yugoslavia or Austria, he committed suicide at Langwasser military camp near Nuremberg, Germany, on 20 July 1946.

Publications
The collapse of the Austro-Hungarian empire, translated by Ian F.D. Morrow, London, Toronto: J.M. Dent, 1930 (Die Katastrophe, Die Zertrümmerung Österreich-Ungarns und das Werden der Nachfolgestaaten, Amalthea Verlag, Zürich-Leipzig-Wien, 1929)
Edmund Glaise von Horstenau: Ein General im Zwielicht: die Erinnerungen Edmund Glaises von Horstenau, Volume 76, Böhlau, 1988,

Footnotes

References
 
 
 Peter Broucek (Eingel. und hrsg.): Ein General im Zwielicht. Die Erinnerungen Edmund Glaises von Horstenau. Böhlau, Wien u.a. 1980 ff.
 Band 1: K.u.k. Generalstabsoffizier und Historiker (= Veröffentlichungen der Kommission für Neuere Geschichte Österreichs. Bd. 67). 1980, .
 Band 2: Minister im Ständestaat und General im OKW (= Veröffentlichungen der Kommission für Neuere Geschichte Österreichs. Bd. 70). 1983, .
 Band 3: Deutscher Bevollmächtigter General in Kroatien und Zeuge des Untergangs des "Tausendjährigen Reiches" (= Veröffentlichungen der Kommission für Neuere Geschichte Österreichs. Bd. 76). 1988, .
 Österreichisches Staatsarchiv, Mitteilungen des österreichischen Staatsarchivs, Band 47, 1999

1882 births
1946 suicides
Austrian military personnel of World War II
Austro-Hungarian Army officers
Vice-Chancellors of Austria
German Army generals of World War II
Generals of Infantry (Wehrmacht)
Austro-Hungarian military personnel of World War I
Historians of World War I
Nazis who committed suicide in prison custody
People from Braunau am Inn
German military personnel who committed suicide
Members of the Reichstag of Nazi Germany
Nazis who committed suicide in Germany
Recipients of the Knights Cross of the War Merit Cross